Phytoptus is a genus of mites in the family Phytoptidae.

References

External links 

Trombidiformes